Ontario Peak, at 8,696 ft, is a high peak in the San Gabriel Mountains of California. Like its neighbor Cucamonga Peak, it is in the San Bernardino National Forest, and in the Cucamonga Wilderness. The peak is named for the nearby city of Ontario about  due south, and first appeared in the General Land Office Forest Atlas in 1908.

The most accessible trailhead for hiking Ontario Peak is in Icehouse Canyon. Forest Service Trail 7W07 leads from here to Icehouse Saddle, from which the Ontario Peak Trail leads to the summit.

See also
Mount San Antonio
Pomona Valley

References

Mountains of San Bernardino County, California
San Gabriel Mountains
San Bernardino National Forest
Mountains of Southern California